is a Japanese footballer currently playing as a defender for Fukushima United.

Career statistics

Club
.

Notes

References

1999 births
Living people
People from Nara, Nara
Association football people from Nara Prefecture
Ritsumeikan University alumni
Japanese footballers
Japan youth international footballers
Association football defenders
J3 League players
Kyoto Sanga FC players
Fukushima United FC players